Grafička škola u Zagrebu (Graphics School of Zagreb) is a public high school in Zagreb, Croatia. The school has 550 students and 70 employees, of which 54 are teachers.

History 
In 1886, two printers completed their apprenticeship in the school. Eight years later, in 1894, another group of 19 book printers finished their education there. By the decision of the Teachers' Council, 1894 is considered the year of establishment of the school.

By the year 1945, more than 1,500 students finished studying in the school.

The first school building was located in Gundulićeva 10. Soon, the school acquired a part of a building where Museum of Arts and Crafts is located today. The main directorate of the graphics industry donated printing machinery, devices and furniture to the school. It moved to the current location Getaldićeva 2 in 1951.

11000 students have graduated there to date.

Names of the school 
The school has changed its name many times:
 1947:  Savezna grafička industrijska škola (Federal School of the Graphics Industry)
 1951:  Grafička škola s praktičnom obukom (Graphics School with Practical Training)
 1962:  Grafički školski centar (School Center of Graphics)
 1972:  Grafički srednjoškolski centar (High School Center of Graphics)
 1981:  Grafički obrazovni centar "Bratstvo i jedinstvo" (Graphical Educational Center "Brotherhood and unity")
 1991:  Grafička škola u Zagrebu (Graphics School of Zagreb) – current name

Curriculum 
The school has seven educational programs:
 Graphics Technician (Grafički tehničar)
 Prepress Technician (Grafički tehničar pripreme)
 Printing Technician (Grafički tehničar tiska)
 Production Technician (Grafički tehničar dorade)
 Graphics Editor – Designer (Grafički urednik – dizajner)
 Multimedia Technician (Medijski tehničar)
 Web Designer (Web dizajner)

Subjects

Graphics Technician

Prepress/Printing/Production Technician

Graphics Editor – Designer 

Educational institutions established in 1894
Schools in Croatia
Education in Zagreb
1894 establishments in Austria-Hungary